The Wright Eclipse Fusion was a low floor articulated single-decker bus body built on the Volvo B7LA chassis by Wrightbus. It was the articulated version of the Wright Eclipse, succeeding the Wright Fusion. 

Of the 88 produced, FirstGroup purchased 67. Of these, twenty were ordered for First West of England services in Bath, nine were ordered for First Aberdeen and one was ordered for First Glasgow in 2004. The other 21 Fusions were delivered to Dublin Bus.

In October 2001, two Wright Eclipse Fusions were sent from First Hampshire & Dorset to First London's Greenford garage to operate a six month trial on route 207. One was painted into First London's fleet livery during this period. No orders resulted from the trial and the Fusions were returned a year later.

The FirstGroup would later partner with Wrightbus in developing the Wright StreetCar, which is built on a modified version of the chassis used for the Eclipse Fusion. Most of the Eclipse Fusions are similar in appearance to its Wrightbus single deckers with the arched roof.

References

External links

Articulated buses
Low-floor buses
Vehicles introduced in 1998
Eclipse Fusion